The Sajur River is a  long river originating in Turkey and flowing into the Euphrates in Syria. It is the smallest of the three rivers joining the Euphrates in Syria, and the only one that joins the Euphrates on its western bank. Occupation in the Sajur basin started in the Lower Palaeolithic period and continues until today.

Course
It is thought to originate in a place to the west of Gaziantep, called Sacır Başı in Turkish. Its name changes to Kavaklık deresi in the historic outskirts of Gaziantep, then to Alleben deresi in the old town, and later to Tabakhane deresi ( tannery stream). As it leaves the old town dirty, it becomes Kara Akar ( black-flowing), regaining its original name Sajur shortly after. From there, the Sajur flows southeast until it crosses the Syria–Turkey border. The river then continues in a roughly easterly direction  until it joins the Euphrates on its right bank in the area that is flooded by the Tishrin Dam reservoir. Both in terms of length, as well as discharge, the Sajur is the smallest of the three rivers that join the Euphrates on Syrian soil – the other two being the Balikh and the Khabur. The Sajur is also the only river in Syria that enters the Euphrates on its right bank; both the Balikh and the Khabur flow into the Euphrates on the left bank.

Drainage basin
The Syrian part of the Sajur basin – the Manbij Plain – has been particularly well-studied. This area is bounded on the north by the Syro–Turkish border and extends as far south as Manbij. To the west, the Manbij Plain is bordered by basalt outcrops; probably the remains of a Pliocene volcano. In the southeast of the plain, limestone outcrops force the Euphrates into the gorge of Qara Quzaq. Reaching heights of  amsl in the north, west and south, the Manbij Plain slopes down to  amsl toward the east. In the western part of the drainage basin, flat grounds with fertile red-brown soils can be found, and this area is suitable for agriculture. Toward the east and along the Sajur, the plain is dissected by numerous wadis, making these parts of the area less suitable for human occupation and agriculture. The Manbij Plain experiences a continental climate. Although much of the area is cultivated today, combined palaeobotanical, climate and vegetation research suggest that the basin would support a xeric woodland vegetation with open oak forest and Rosaceae (rose/plum family) in the absence of human activity.

History
Occupation of the Sajur river basin started as early as the Lower Palaeolithic period, as evidenced by Acheulean stone artefacts. Middle Palaeolithic artefacts have been found as well.

Economy
Both Turkey and Syria use water from the Sajur for irrigation purposes. Since the 19th century, occupation in and cultivation of the Sajur basin have steadily increased, especially in the western, more fertile part of the area. The introduction of motorized pumps has led to a considerable decrease of the groundwater table, with the effect that many wells have dried up. Turkey has built the Kayacık Dam on the Ayfinar Deresi, one of the two streams that join to form the Sajur. The city of Aleppo disposes part of its wastewater into the Sajur drainage system.

See also
Tigris–Euphrates river system

Notes

References

Rivers of Syria
Rivers of Turkey
Aleppo Governorate
International rivers of Asia
Landforms of Gaziantep Province
Tributaries of the Euphrates River